Cacosceles is a genus of beetles belonging to the family Cerambycidae.

The species of this genus are found in southern Africa.

Species
The following species are recognised in the genus Cacosceles:

Cacosceles gracilis 
Cacosceles latus  
Cacosceles newmannii 
Cacosceles oedipus

References

Cerambycidae
Cerambycidae genera